Alyxia bracteolosa is a species of flowering plant in the family Apocynaceae, native to the Solomon Islands and south-western Pacific (Fiji, Samoa, Tonga, Vanuatu and Wallis and Futuna). It was first described by Louis Claude Richard in 1862.

References

bracteolosa
Flora of the Solomon Islands (archipelago)
Flora of Fiji
Flora of Samoa
Flora of Tonga
Flora of Vanuatu
Flora of Wallis and Futuna
Plants described in 1862